Delphi is an unincorporated community in Huron County, in the U.S. state of Ohio.

History
The community is said to be named after Delphi, New York.  A variant name was Ripleyville. A post office called Ripleyville was established in 1830, and remained in operation until 1902.

References

Unincorporated communities in Huron County, Ohio
Unincorporated communities in Ohio